An election to Dinefwr Borough Council was held in May 1976. It was preceded by the 1973 election and followed by the 1979 election. On the same day there was UK local elections and elections to the other local authorities and community councils in Wales.

Labour held most seats in the more urbanised part of the authority while the rural seats were all won by Independents. Plaid Cymru captured two seats from Labour at Ammanford and Penygroes.

Results

Ammanford Town Ward 1 (one seat)

Ammanford Town Ward 2 (one seat)

Ammanford Town Ward 3 (one seat)

Ammanford Town Ward 4 (one seat)

Ammanford Town Ward 5 (one seat)

Betws (one seat)

Brynamman (one seat)

Cilycwm (one seat)

Cwmamman (three seats)

Cwmllynfell (one seat)

Cynwyl Gaeo and Llanwrda (one seat)

Glynamman (one seat)

Llandeilo Fawr North Ward (one seat)

Llandeilo Fawr South Ward (one seat)

Llandeilo Town (two seats)

Llanddeusant / Myddfai (one seat)

Llandovery Town (two seats)

Llandybie and Heolddu (three seats)

Llanegwad and Llanfynydd (one seat)

Llanfihangel Aberbythych and Llangathen (one seat)
Pugh had been elected as a Labour candidate in 1973.

Llangadog and Llansadwrn (one seat)

Llansawel and Talley (one seat)

Penygroes (two seats)

Saron (two seats)

References

1976
1976 Welsh local elections
May 1976 events in the United Kingdom